The ambient pressure on an object is the pressure of the surrounding medium, such as a gas or liquid, in contact with the object.

Atmosphere
Within the atmosphere, the ambient pressure decreases as elevation increases. By measuring ambient atmospheric pressure, a pilot may determine altitude (see pitot-static system).

Underwater
The ambient pressure in water with a free surface is a combination of the hydrostatic pressure due to the weight of the water column and the atmospheric pressure on the free surface. This increases approximately linearly with depth. Since water is much denser than air, much greater changes in ambient pressure can be experienced under water. Each  of depth adds another bar to the ambient pressure.

Ambient pressure diving is underwater diving exposed to the water pressure at depth, rather than in a pressure-excluding atmospheric diving suit or a submersible.

Other environments
The concept is not limited to environments frequented by people. Almost any place in the universe will have an ambient pressure, from the hard vacuum of deep space to the interior of an exploding supernova. At extremely small scales the concept of pressure becomes irrelevant, and it is undefined at a gravitational singularity.

Units of pressure

The SI unit of pressure is the pascal (Pa), which is a very small unit relative to atmospheric pressure on Earth, so kilopascals (kPa) are more commonly used in this context. The ambient atmospheric pressure at sea level is not constant: it varies with the weather, but averages around 100 kPa. In fields such as meteorology and underwater diving, it is common to see ambient pressure expressed in bar or millibar. One bar is 100 kPa or approximately ambient pressure at sea level. Ambient pressure may in other circumstances be measured in pounds per square inch (psi) or in standard atmospheres (atm). In underwater diving the industry convention is to measure ambient pressure in terms of water column. The metric unit is the metre sea water which is defined as 1/10 bar.

Examples of ambient pressure in various environments
Pressures are given in terms of the normal ambient pressure experienced by humans — standard atmospheric pressure at sea level on earth.

See also

References

Further reading 
  
 

Pressure
Underwater diving physics